Gjorm is a village in the Vlorë County, southwestern Albania. It was part of the former municipality Brataj. At the 2015 local government reform, it became part of the municipality Selenicë.

World War II 

During World War II, Gjorm was part of the battlefield of the battle of Gjorm, where Albanian resistance units defeated and routed the troops of the Kingdom of Italy.

Sources 

Populated places in Selenicë
Villages in Vlorë County